Nationality words link to articles with information on the nation's poetry or literature (for instance, Irish or France).

Events 
 August 12 — Night of the Murdered Poets, the execution of thirteen Soviet Jews in the Lubyanka Prison in Moscow, Soviet Union, including several poets.
 November — The Group British poetry movement of the 1950s and 1960s begins at Downing College, University of Cambridge: Philip Hobsbaum along with two friends – Tony Davis and Neil Morris – dissatisfied with the way poetry has been read aloud in the university, decides to place a notice in the undergraduate newspaper Varsity for people interested in forming a poetry discussion group. Five others, including Peter Redgrove, come along to the first meeting. The group meets once a week during term; it moves to London in 1955.
 E. E. Cummings is appointed to a Charles Eliot Norton Professorship at Harvard.
 Contact, a mimeographed poetry magazine, founded by Ramond Souster (ceases publication in 1954); Contact Press, an important publisher of Canadian poetry, is also founded (closes in 1967).
 Lines Review, a Scottish poetry magazine, is founded by Callum Macdonald in Edinburgh.

Works published in English 
Listed by nation where the work was first published and again by the poet's native land, if different; substantially revised works listed separately:

Canada 
 Alfred Bailey, Border River
 Earle Birney, Trial of a City and Other Verse. Toronto: Ryerson.
 Louis Dudek, Raymond Souster and Irving Layton. Cerberus. Toronto: Contact Press, 1952.
Louis Dudek, The Searching Image. Toronto: Ryerson Press, 1952.
Louis Dudek, Twenty-Four Poems. Toronto: Contact Press, 1952.
 Wilson MacDonald, The Lyric Year. Toronto: Ryerson.
 Jay Macpherson, Nineteen Poems
 E. J. Pratt, Towards the Last Spike, Toronto: Macmillan. Governor General's Award 1952.

India, in English 
 Sri Aurobindo, Last Poems ( Poetry in English ), mostly philosophical, mystical poetry; Pondicherry: Sri Aurobindo Ashram, posthumously published (died 1950), posthumously published (died 1950)
 Dilip Kumar Roy, Sri Aurobindo Came to Me, Pondicherry: Sri Aurobindo Ashram
 Themis, Poems ( Poetry in English ), 74 mystical lyrics, from the Aurobindoean school; Pondicherry: Sri Aurobindo Ashram
 G. V. Subbaramayya, Songs and Sonnets ( Poetry in English ), Nellore: Viveka Publishers
 Nissim Ezekiel, A Time to Change( Poetry in English ),

New Zealand 
 James K. Baxter, Louis Johnson and Anton Vogt, Poems Unpleasant,  Christchurch: Pegasus Press
 A. R. D. Fairburn:
 Three Poems
 Strange Rendezvous
 Keith Sinclair, Songs for a Summer and Other Poems
 Robert Thompson, editor, 13 New Zealand Poets

United Kingdom 
 A. Alvarez, Poems
 W. H. Auden, Nones, published February 22 in the United Kingdom (first published in February 1951 in the United States)
 William Buchan, 3rd Baron Tweedsmuir, Personal Poems
 C. Day-Lewis, translation, The Aenid of Virgil (see also The Georgics of Virgil 1940, The Eclogues of Virgil 1963)
 Paul Dehn, Romantic Landscape
 Patric Dickinson, The Sailing Race, and Other Poems
 Lawrence Durrell, A Key To Modern Poetry
 Nissim Ezekiel, Time To Change, Indian living at this time in the United Kingdom
 Gabriel Fielding, The Frog Prince and Other Poems
 Michael Hamburger, translator into English from the German original of Austrian Georg Trakl's Decline: 12 Poems, Guido Morris / Latin Press
 David Jones, The Anathemata
 Thomas Kinsella, The Starlit Eye
 Louis MacNeice, Ten Burnt Offerings
 Edwin Muir, Collected Poems 1921–51
 James Reeves, The Password, and Other Poems
 Sir Osbert Sitwell, Wrack at Tidesend, published on May 16, a sequel to England Reclaimed of 1927 (see also On the Continent 1958)
 Dylan Thomas:
 Collected Poems 1934–1952
 In Country Sleep, including the poem "Do Not Go Gentle into that Good Night"
 R.S. Thomas, An Acre of Land

United States 
 R. P. Blackmur, Language as Gesture, criticism
 Robert Creeley, Le Fou, American published in Europe
 Archibald Macleish, Collected Poems, 1917–1952, winner of the Pulitzer Prize
 W. S. Merwin, A Mask for Janus, New Haven, Connecticut: Yale University Press; awarded the Yale Younger Poets Prize, 1952 (reprinted as part of The First Four Books of Poems, 1975)
 Frank O'Hara, A City in Winter and Other Poems
 Kenneth Rexroth, The Dragon and the Unicorn, a verse journal of his European travels
 Wallace Stevens, Selected Poems, Fortune Press
 Jesse Stuart, Kentucky Is my Land
 New World Writing the first of an annual paperback anthology of prose, drama and poetry; continues to 1959 in poetry
 Peter Viereck, The First Morning
 Yvor Winter, Collected Poems

Other 
 R. Berndt, editor, Djanggawul, anthology of Australian poetry
 Seaforth Mackenzie, editor Australian Poetry, 1951-2, Sydney: Angus and Robertson; Australia

Works published in other languages

France 
 Rene-Guy Cadou, Helene ou le regne vegetal, Volume 1, published posthumously (died 1951)
 Jean Cayrol, Les Mots sont aussi des demeures 1952
 Jean Cocteau, Le Chiffre sept
 Pierre Emmanuel, pen name of Noël Mathieu, Babel
 Jean Grosjean, Le Livre du juste
 Benjamin Péret, Air mexicain
 Raymond Queneau, Si tu t'imagines
 Francis Ponge, La Rage de lexpression
 Georges Schéhadé, Les Poésies

India 
In each section, listed in alphabetical order by first name:

Hindi 
 Haradayalu Singh, Ravan, poem written in Braja Bhasa; with characters from classical epic poems and presenting Ravana in a sympathetic light; 17 chapters
 Narmada Prasad Khare, Svar-Pathey
 Ramadhari Singh Dinakar, Rasmi Rathi, epic poem about Karna, a character in the Mahabharata

Kannada 
 D. V. Gundappa, translator, Umarana Osage, translated from the English of Edward Fitzgerald's translation of The Rubaiyatt of Omar Khayyam
 M. Gopalakrishna Adiga, Nadedu Banna Dari, poems showing the transition in Indian poetry from the more idealistic Navodaya tradition to Navya poetry which is more pessimistic and uses imagery to provide structure; Kannada
 Pejavara Sadashiva Rao, Varuna, written before 1950, but differing distinctly from navodaya poetry; using original rhythm and with subject matter from the experiences of an alienated individual; including "Natyotsava", considered by some critics as the earliest navya poem in the Kannada language; published posthumously (the author died at age 26 in Italy)

Other languages in India 
 Amrita Pritam, Sarghi Vela, romantic and progressive poems; Punjabi
 Bahinabai, Bahinabaici Kavita, Marathi
 Birendra Chattopadhyay, Ranur Janya, Bengali
 Chandranath Mishra, Yugacakra, humorous and satirical poems by "a major poet of Maithili", according to Indian academic Sisir Kumar Das (see also Unata pal 1972, a revised and expanded edition)
 Faiz Ahmad Faiz, Dast-e-Saba, Urdu
 Mehr Lal Soni Zia Fatehabadi, Nai Subah (The New Morn), collection of poems published by Adaaraa Seemab, Daryaganj, Delhi in 1952. Urdu
 Gangaprasad Upadhyay, Arodaya mahakavya, epic poem on Swami Dayananda; Sanskrit
 Jnanindra Barma Eka Ratri, Uttara Kranti, Ratnarakha, Oriya
 Mir Shaban Dar, Qissa-e-Bahram Shah, popular romantic poem in masnavi form, modeled on a Persian poem; Kashmiri
 Parsram Rohra, Sitar, Sindhi
 Pinakin Thakore, Alap, Gujarati
 Pir Atiquallah, Pirnama, comic narrative poem in masnavi form on the "Ways of the Pir"; shows the influence of Maqbool; Kashmiri
 Rayaprolu Subba Rao, Rupanavanitamu, poems honoring womanhood and spiritual love; Telugu
 Sreedhara Menon, Onappattukar, Malayalam

Other languages 
 Paul Celan, Poppy and Memory, Romanian-born poet writing in German
 Gabriela Mistral, Los sonetos de la muerte y otros poemas elegíacos, Santiago, Chile: Philobiblion
 Sean O Riordain, Eireaball Spideoige, including "Adhlacadh Mo Mhathar", "Malairt", "Cnoc Melleri" and "Siollabadh", Gaelic-language, Ireland
 Wisława Szymborska: Dlatego żyjemy ("That's Why We Are Alive"), Poland

Awards and honors 
 Consultant in Poetry to the Library of Congress (later the post would be called "Poet Laureate Consultant in Poetry to the Library of Congress"): William Carlos Williams appointed this year (but did not serve).
 Bollingen Prize: Marianne Moore
 Frost Medal: Carl Sandburg
 National Book Award for Poetry: Marianne Moore, Collected Poems
 Pulitzer Prize for Poetry: Marianne Moore, Collected Poems
 King's Gold Medal for Poetry: Andrew Young
 Fellowship of the Academy of American Poets: Padraic Colum
 Canada: Governor General's Award, poetry or drama: Towards the Last Spike, E. J. Pratt

Births 
Death years link to the corresponding "[year] in poetry" article:
 January 2 – Jimmy Santiago Baca, American poet and writer
 January 10 – Dorianne Laux, American poet
 January 11 – Carla Harryman,  American poet and playwright
 January 17 – Barry Dempster, Canadian poet and novelist
 January 20 – Roo Borson, pen name of Ruth Elizabeth Borson, American native living in Canada
 January 25 – Alice Fulton, American poet, author and MacArthur Foundation fellow
 February 24
 Maxine Chernoff, American novelist, poet and editor
 Judith Ortiz Cofer, Puerto Rican American author of poetry, short stories, autobiography, essays and young adult novels
 March 12 – Naomi Shihab Nye, American poet and songwriter born to a Palestinian father and American mother
 April 12 – Gary Soto, Mexican-American poet and author
 May – Susan Stewart, American poet, academic and literary critic
 June 20 – Vikram Seth, Indian poet, novelist, travel writer, librettist, children's writer, biographer and memoirist
 June 5 – Mark Jarman, American poet and critic often identified with the "New Narrative" branch of the New Formalism
 August 5 – D. C. Reid, Canadian poet, novelist and short story writer
 August 12 – Robert Minhinnick, Welsh poet and writer
 August 24 – Linton Kwesi Johnson, Jamaican-born musician and poet
 August 28 – Rita Dove, African American poet and author and Poet Laureate of the United States
 September 18 – Alberto Ríos, American poet and writer
 September 21 – Jock Scot, born John Leslie (died 2016), Scottish performance poet
 October 6 – Matthew Sweeney (died 2018), Irish poet
 October 26 – Andrew Motion, English poet, novelist, biographer and Poet Laureate of the United Kingdom
 November 7 – Malca Litovitz, Canadian poet, author and educator
 December 12 – Helen Dunmore (died 2017), English poet
 December 19 – Sean O'Brien, English poet
 December 20 – Sky Gilbert, Canadian poet, writer, actor, academic and drag performer
 Also:
 Harry Clifton, Irish
 Menna Elfyn, Welsh
 Jan Horner, Canadian
 Carole Glasser Langille, Canadian
 Myron Lysenko, Australian
 Maurice Scully, Irish poet and editor.
 Carolyn Smart, English–Canadian poet and educator
 Elizabeth Spires, American poet and academic
 thalia, Greek-born Australian

Deaths 

Birth years link to the corresponding "[year] in poetry" article:
 January 22 – Roger Vitrac, 52 (born 1899), French Surrealist poet and dramatist
 February 3 – Kambara Ariake 蒲原有明, pen name of Kambara Hayao (born 1876), Taishō and Shōwa period Japanese poet and novelist
 March 1 – Masao Kume 久米正雄, writing under the pen name "Santei" (born 1891), late Taishō period and early Shōwa period Japanese playwright, novelist and haiku poet
 July 8 – August Alle (born 1890), Estonian writer and poet
 August 1 – Arthur Shearly Cripps (born 1869), English Anglican missionary, short story writer and poet
 August 22 – E. J. Brady (born 1869), Australian
 September 26 – George Santayana (born 1863), Spanish-American philosopher, essayist, poet and novelist
 November 16 – Charles Maurras, 84 (born 1868), French author, poet and critic
 November 18 – Paul Éluard, 56 (born 1895), French poet; broke with Surrealism on becoming a Stalinist (heart attack)
 November 21 – Henriette Roland Holst (born 1869), Dutch poet and socialist
 November 23 – Aaro Hellaakoski (born 1893), Finnish poet
 December 27 – Patrick Joseph Hartigan, writing under the pen name "Joseph O'Brien" (born 1878), Australian
 Also:
 Wendy Jenkins, Australian

See also 

 Poetry
 List of poetry awards
 List of years in poetry

Notes 

20th-century poetry
Poetry